Rashan Peiris (born 21 January 1982) is a Sri Lankan cricketer. He played 79 first-class and 50 List A matches between 2000 and 2009. He made his Twenty20 debut on 17 August 2004, for Colts Cricket Club in the 2004 SLC Twenty20 Tournament. He was also part of Sri Lanka's squad for the 2000 Under-19 Cricket World Cup.

References

External links
 

1982 births
Living people
Sri Lankan cricketers
Antonians Sports Club cricketers
Bloomfield Cricket and Athletic Club cricketers
Colts Cricket Club cricketers
Sri Lanka Air Force Sports Club cricketers
People from Western Province, Sri Lanka
People from Panadura